Ural Airlines (Ural’skiye avialinii) is an airline based in Yekaterinburg, Sverdlovsk Oblast, Russia, that operates scheduled and chartered domestic and international flights out of  Koltsovo International Airport. In 2018, the company transported nine million passengers.

Overview
The airline was founded in 1943 as Sverdlovsk State Air Enterprises, and later became part of Aeroflot, the Soviet state airline, being in charge of Yekaterinburg Airport. Following the split-up of Aeroflot, Ural Airlines became a joint stock company incorporated under the laws of the Russian Federation on 28 December 1993, and the airline business was separated from the airport.

In 2010, Ural Airlines retired all of its Antonov An-24s, Ilyushin Il-86s and Tupolev Tu-154B-2s. The airline's Tupolev Tu-154M, in 164-seat two-class configuration, was retired on October 16, 2011.

Ural Airlines has 3348 employees.

As of 2012, the airline also planned to buy a training complex for the Airbus A330-300.

In 2017, Skytrax gave Ural Airlines 3 stars, which made it the fourth airline with three stars in Russia and CIS after S7 Airlines, Uzbekistan Airlines and Air Moldova.

Currently, main hubs of Ural Airlines are Moscow-Domodedovo and Yekaterinburg. Ural Airlines has plans to increase its number of hubs, by developing hubs at Moscow-Sheremetyevo and Moscow-Zhukovsky.

In 2020, flights commenced to Russian-controlled Crimea.

Corporate affairs 

 
A million passengers per year was first achieved in 2006. Since then, the airline and its passenger numbers have both grown. In 2013, the airline transported 4.419 million passengers, the sixth most in Russia that year.

Destinations

Codeshare agreements
Ural Airlines has codeshare agreements with the following airlines:

Azerbaijan Airlines
Belavia
Czech Airlines 
KLM
Red Wings Airlines
S7 Airlines
Uzbekistan Airways

Fleet

Current fleet
, the Ural Airlines fleet consists of the following aircraft:

Ural Airlines also started considering updating its fleet with newer Airbus A320neo family or Boeing 737 Next Generation and is still considering purchasing Airbus A330. It took delivery of its first Airbus A320neo in August 2019. The airline also considered purchasing Irkut MC-21s, but the plans were probably withdrawn.

Retired fleet

Accidents and incidents 

 On 15 August 2019, Ural Airlines Flight 178, an Airbus A321 registered as VQ-BOZ, was scheduled to fly from Zhukovsky International Airport to Simferopol.  226 passengers and 7 crew were on board. Although 74 passengers sought medical treatment, only 1 major injury occurred, and all passengers survived.

See also
Babyflot

References

External links

Official website

Airlines of Russia
Companies based in Yekaterinburg
Former Aeroflot divisions
Airlines banned in the European Union
Airlines established in 1993
Aviation in Sverdlovsk Oblast
Russian brands
Russian companies established in 1993